"Halloween of Horror" is the fourth episode of the twenty-seventh season of the American animated television series The Simpsons, and the 578th episode of the series overall. It originally aired in the United States on Fox on October 18, 2015.

It is the first Halloween-themed episode of The Simpsons that is not part of the show's Treehouse of Horror series. 

The episode received highly positive reviews from critics.

Plot
The day before Halloween, the Simpson family completely decorates their house, calling it "Everscream Terrors". Homer stores the plastic skeletons too close to the furnace, and he decides to take the remains to Grampa's home and buy something new at the Halloween pop-up store. On their way to the store, Lisa and Bart see a sign advertising the upcoming Krustyland Halloween Horror Night, and share their excitement for it. At the Halloween shop, Apu gets angry at three lazy employees who are sleeping on their jobs, telling them to go back to work. While Homer is looking for a decoration to replace the skeletons, one of the workers gives Homer a deal where if he buys one "Señor Skeleton", he will give Homer a set of four of them for free. Homer accepts the deal and tells Apu about it, who promptly fires the workers. The three then vow revenge on Homer.

Later, Homer takes the children to the Halloween Horror Night. Lisa gets scared by the costumed people and tells Homer that she wants to go home. Although Homer tells her that the Horror Night is not scary, Lisa gets separated from her father, and gets even more scared by the zombies, as well as more costumed people, leading to the park being closed. At school, Lisa's unsettling experience causes her to develop a fear of Halloween decorations, becoming scared from even the simplest Halloween figures such as paper zombies and pumpkins. In horror, she then hides inside a locker, only to be rescued later by Marge. Back home, Marge tells Homer they should shut down Everscream Terrors for Lisa's sake, making both Homer and Bart upset. As Marge takes Bart and Maggie to the most famous Halloween block party at a cul-de-sac in Springfield, Homer tries to bond with Lisa, offering to do a puzzle with her at home. Meanwhile, the three disgruntled workers have come for their revenge, and begin to stalk them.

Homer locks up the house to protect them from the three men; however, they are already inside the house. He tries to take Lisa to the Flanders' house, but she runs back inside to get Tailee, a fur toy raccoon tail from early childhood that brought her comfort. Homer rushes to save her, only for them to wind up face-to-face with the home invaders. The two run up the stairs and hide in the attic, and the invaders are unable to find them.

Marge arrives at the block party with Bart and Maggie, but they are told by the security guard the party is for residents only after visitors wrecked last year's party. After unsuccessfully trying to bribe the security guard into letting them in, Marge tries to take Bart and Maggie trick-or-treating, but it is late out and all the children are asleep. The adults of Springfield come out in their mostly suggestive costumes and a musical number about adult Halloween follows (the musical number, "NC-17 Halloween", is a parody of "Time Warp" from The Rocky Horror Picture Show).

At the Simpsons' house, Homer apologizes to Lisa for having not listened to her the night before, and admits that he gets scared of things too, but encourages her to not let her fears prevent her from using her thinking skills. They decide to use their various holiday decorations to signal for help, but they accidentally activate the Señor Skeletons, giving away their hiding location to the three men. Homer climbs onto the roof to light up the 4th of July fireworks, but the strong wind extinguishes the matches. Lisa then remembers that Tailee is made of face oil-soaked polyester and will burn easily, and decides to sacrifice Tailee and light the fireworks to attract people's attention. This plan is a success, and the whole neighborhood wakes up. The home invaders are then arrested by the police almost immediately, and Homer rebuilds Everscream Terrors, so the whole town can enjoy it as Lenny and Carl arrive dressed as Kang and Kodos. Lisa, now unafraid of the decorations, also joins in the fun, and manages to scare Marge just as she arrives home with Bart, who is delighted to see the house decorated again.

During the end credits, Maggie finds the half-burnt Tailee which magically restores itself to the tune of John Carpenter's Halloween.

Production
TBA

Reception
The episode received a 1.7 rating and was watched by a total of 3.69 million people, making it the most watched show on Fox that night.

Dennis Perkins of The A.V. Club gave the episode an A−, stating "An impeccably directed, character-driven story about children's fears and grown-up responsibility, the episode, credited to writer Carolyn Omine, is one of the most assured, human, and outright best Simpsons episodes in years."

The episode received an Emmy nomination for Outstanding Animated Program. Additionally, Carolyn Omine was nominated for a Writers Guild of America Award for Outstanding Writing in Animation at the 68th Writers Guild of America Awards for her script to this episode.

References

External links

2015 American television episodes
Halloween television episodes
The Simpsons (season 27) episodes
Television episodes written by Carolyn Omine